Ozcopa is a genus of spiders in the family Corinnidae. It was first described in 2015 by Raven. , it contains 6 species, all from Queensland.

Species

Ozcopa comprises the following species:
Ozcopa chiunei Raven, 2015
Ozcopa colloffi Raven, 2015
Ozcopa margotandersenae Raven, 2015
Ozcopa mcdonaldi Raven, 2015
Ozcopa monteithi Raven, 2015
Ozcopa zborowskii Raven, 2015

References

Corinnidae
Araneomorphae genera
Spiders of Australia